John F. Martin Jr. was an American diplomat who served as Ambassador to Costa Rica from 1920 to 1921.

References

Ambassadors of the United States to Costa Rica
Year of birth missing
Year of death missing